And Then There Was No One is a novel by Gilbert Adair first published in 2009. After The Act of Roger Murgatroyd and A Mysterious Affair of Style, it is the third book in the Evadne Mount trilogy. However, rather than being yet another more or less straightforward whodunit, albeit with postmodern overtones, And Then There Was No One thoroughly blurs the boundaries between reality and fiction; or rather, reality, fiction, and metafiction.

The book is presented in the form of a (fictional) memoir written by a British author called Gilbert Adair who has recently published two successful whodunits featuring mystery writer turned amateur sleuth Evadne Mount entitled The Act of Roger Murgatroyd and A Mysterious Affair of Style. In September 2011, he travels to Meiringen, Switzerland to participate in the town's Sherlock Holmes conference. While he is staying there, two unexpected things happen: firstly, Anglo-Bulgarian novelist and essayist Gustav Slavorigin, the star of the festival, is murdered; and secondly, to his great surprise, Adair discovers Evadne Mount, the inspiration for his protagonist and the sharer of royalties from the two novels, sitting among the audience.

As with the first two books in the trilogy, the title is again a variation on an Agatha Christie novel, And Then There Were None.

Major themes

As opposed to the other novels in the trilogy, in And Then There Was No One there is a definitive shift away from the murder mystery and its solution toward "self-referentiality", toward the author and his or her problems. One aspect is plagiarism, which at one point is even discussed as a possible motive for Slavorigin's murder; another is the author's choice of subject. In the years before his violent death, Slavorigin had been in hiding as he had published several essays critical of the United States and had therefore become, like Rushdie in reverse, the target of a fatwā-like edict pronounced by some obscure Texan multi-millionaire. A third aspect is the author's wish to distance himself from his own creations if not to get rid of them once and for all, to "murder" them—the way Arthur Conan Doyle tried to rid himself of Sherlock Holmes at the Reichenbach Falls and Adair is struggling to dispose of Evadne Mount.

Reviews

 Tom Adair 
 Hugo Barnacle 
 Philip French
 Robert Hanks 
 Jake Kerridge 
 Caroline Moore 
 Laura Wilson

Further reading

 Flann O'Brien's At Swim-Two-Birds (1939), Cees Nooteboom's Een lied van schijn en wezen (1981), and Stewart Home's Cunt (1999) are also novels about authors writing works of fiction where various storylines become intertwined.
 A host of literary allusions ranging from Oscar Wilde to Elfriede Jelinek and from Pierre Louÿs to Marianne Moore can be found in And Then There Was No One. One of Adair's precursors in this field was crime writer Edmund Crispin, for example in his debut novel, The Case of the Gilded Fly (1944).

References

2009 British novels
Postmodern novels
Self-reflexive novels
British mystery novels
Fiction set in 2011
Novels by Gilbert Adair
Faber and Faber books